Parydra quadrituberculata is a species of shore flies in the family Ephydridae.

References

Ephydridae
Articles created by Qbugbot
Taxa named by Hermann Loew
Insects described in 1862